Somdet Phra Ariyavangsagatayana (26 June 1927), born Amborn Prasatthapong, is the current Supreme Patriarch of Thailand and Superior General of the Dhammayut Order. Ordained as a bhikkhu in 1948 with the Dhamma name of Ambaro. In 2008 he was appointed abbot of Wat Ratchabophit in Bangkok. In 2017 he was appointed Supreme Patriarch by King Vajiralongkorn, succeeding Vajirañāṇasaṃvara who died in 2013.

Early life
Amborn Prasatthapong was born on 26 June 1927 at Mueang Ratchaburi, Ratchaburi Province to Nab and Tarn Prasatthapong, the second child of nine children. He was educated at Thewa Nukhro primary school in Lopburi. In 1937 he was ordained as a Samanera (or novice monk) at Wat Sattanat Pariwat in Ratchaburi. He studied the Pali language and graduated with a fourth level certificate in Pali studies in 1947.

Monkhood

On 9 May 1948 Amborn was ordained as a full bhikkhu, with the Dhamma name of Ambaro, in the Dhammayuttika Nikaya at Wat Ratchabophit in Bangkok, with Vasana Vāsano as his preceptor. Vasana Vāsano later became the 18th Supreme Patriarch of Thailand, reigning from 1973 to 1988. In 1950 Ambaro graduated with a sixth level in Pali studies. He continued his education at the Mahamakut Buddhist University, obtaining a degree in religious studies in 1957. And at the Banaras Hindu University in India, graduating with a master's degree in history and archaeology in 1969. In 2009 he was presented with an honorary doctorate degree by Mahamakut Buddhist University. In 2010 he was presented with an honorary doctorate by Mahachulalongkornrajavidyalaya University.

Ambaro was a student of the highly revered monk   a Vipassanā master and the former abbott of Wat Pa Udom Somphon in Sakon Nakhon province. Ambaro was practitioner of the Thai Forest Tradition of ascetic monks, which were known for their devotion to meditation and only eating once a day.

In 1973 Ambaro joined a group of Dhammaduta, or 'the messenger of the Dharma', on a trip to establish Thai Buddhism in Australia.

In 2009 Ambaro was appointed abbot of Wat Ratchabophit, a royal temple of the first class, built in 1869 by King Chulalongkorn, where he has lived since 1948. On 5 December 2009 Ambaro was created the 2nd Somdet Phra Maha Muniwong by King Bhumibol Adulyadej. This is a title given to a senior monk in the Dhammayuttika order.

Supreme Patriarch
On 7 February 2017, Prime Minister Prayut Chan-o-cha confirmed the appointment of Somdet Phra Maha Muniwong as the 20th Supreme Patriarch of Thailand in a televised address. He succeeded Nyanasamvara Suvaddhana the 19th Supreme Patriarch, who died on 24 October 2013 at the age of 100. The prime minister stated: "I submitted the names of five qualified monks for His Majesty to  consider. On Monday night, I was informed His Majesty chose Somdet Phra Maha Muniwong."

Somdet Phra Maha Muniwong took the name Ariyavangsagatayana and became Somdet Phra Ariyavongsagatanana. On 12 February 2017 he was invested by King Vajiralongkorn in a ceremony at the chapel royal of the Temple of the Emerald Buddha.

List of appointments

1996–present: Member of the Sangha Supreme Council for the Dhammayuttika order
2008–present: Abbott of Wat Ratchabophit
2017–present: 20th Supreme Patriarch of Thailand
2017–present: Head of the Dhammayuttika Nikaya order
2017–present: President of the Sangha Supreme Council

See also

 Supreme Patriarch of Thailand
 Vajiralongkorn

References

Links
  Official Facebook profile

1927 births
Thai Theravada Buddhist monks
Supreme Patriarchs of Thailand
Recipients of Abhidhaja Maha Rattha Guru
People from Ratchaburi province
Living people